Two papal conclaves were held in 1503.

The first conclave was held following the death of Pope Alexander VI on August 18, 1503.  This conclave lasted from September 16, 1503 to September 22, 1503 and ended in the election of Cardinal Francesco Todeschini Piccolomini, who took the name of Pope Pius III.

The second conclave followed the death of Pope Pius III on October 18, 1503.  This conclave lasted from October 31, 1503 to November 1, 1503 and ended in the election of Cardinal Giuliano della Rovere, who took the name of Pope Julius II.

Participants in the Conclaves of 1503

The following table lists all cardinals eligible to vote in the papal conclaves of 1503 and indicates which conclaves each cardinal actually participated in.

Konrad Eubel provides a list of the cardinals at the Conclave of October 1503, in which he states that Melchior Cupis von Meckau was not present. Joannes Burchard, the papal Master of Ceremonies for the Conclave, does not include Von Meckau or his conclavists in his list of participants.

See also
List of popes

References

Sources
 "Conclaves of the 16th Century", in ''The Biographical Dictionary of the Cardinals of the Holy Roman Church

Pope Julius II
1503